Toklucak (literally "place of yearling lambs") is a Turkish place name that may refer to the following places in Turkey:

 Toklucak, Amasya, a village in the district of Amasya, Amasya Province
 Toklucak, Emirdağ, a village in the district of Emirdağ, Afyonkarahisar Province